Mama Maghan was a post imperial Mansa of the Mali Empire, and Kangaba during the 17th century.

Notable events 
Mansa Mama Maghan attempted to conquer the Bamana in 1667 and laid siege to Segou–Koro for around three years. Segou, however, was protected by Bitòn Coulibaly, qnd successfully defended itself and forced Mama Maghan to withdraw. Either as a counter-attack or simply the progression of pre-planned assaults against the remnants of Mali, the Bamana sacked and burned Niani, the capitol of the Mali Empire, in 1670. Their forces marched as far north as Kangaba, where the mansa was obliged to make a peace with them, promising not to attack downstream of Mali. The Bamana, likewise, vowed not to advance farther upstream than Niamina. Following this disastrous set of events, Mama Maghan abandoned the capitol, which the Bamana sacked and burned, resulting in the Mali Empire rapidly disintegrating and ceasing to exist, being replaced by independent chiefdoms. The Keita, of which Mama Maghan was a part of, retreated to the town of Kangaba, where they became provincial chiefs.

References 

Mansas of Mali
17th-century African people
People of the Mali Empire